D100 may refer to:

 Nikon D100, A digital camera manufactured by Nikon
 State road D100 (Turkey), a major highway in Turkey
 D100 road, a Croatian state road
 d100, the notation for percentile dice
 Zocchihedron, a 100-sided playing die
 Dodge D100 a model of Dodge truck from 1961 to 1993
 D100 Radio, a Hong Kong Internet radio station
 D100 Radio New York, an Internet radio station

See also 
 100D (disambiguation)
 100 (disambiguation)

ko:D100